Sarcarsamakulam  block is a revenue block of Coimbatore district of the Indian state of Tamil Nadu. This revenue block consist of 8 panchayat villages.

List of Panchayat Villages 

They are,

References 

Revenue blocks of Coimbatore district